Guyanese Americans are an ethnic group of Americans who can trace their ancestry back to Guyana. As of 2019, there are 231,649 Guyanese Americans currently living in the United States. The majority of Guyanese live in New York City – some 140,000 – making them the fifth-largest foreign-born population in the city.

History 
After the independence of Guyana from the United Kingdom, in 1966, Guyanese immigration to the United States increased dramatically. Political and economic uncertainty, and the internal strife two years earlier as well as a radical change in US immigration policy opening up opportunities to non-Europeans prompted many Guyanese who could make the move to seek opportunities abroad. An average of 6,080 people a year emigrated from Guyana between 1969 and 1976, increasing to an average of 14,400 between 1976 and 1981.

Many of the first Guyanese immigrants to the United States were of African descent. They were women who were recruited as domestic workers or nursing assistants. Prior to the Immigration and Nationality Act of 1952 Guyanese of Asian descent faced immigration restrictions by the Asiatic Barred Zone. However, many Guyanese who had studied in the US in the mid 20th century or earlier stayed on in the US; although some like Cheddi Jagan returned to Guyana. Shirley Chisholm's father represents one of the earliest of Guyanese immigrants to the US during the 20th century; emigration from Guyana at that time was mostly to Caribbean or Commonwealth countries.

Many Indo-Guyanese immigrants emigrated to New York City during the upheavals of the 1970s and 1980s, a group descended from the original Indian indentured servants that arrived to Guyana in the early 1800s after the abolishing of slavery by the British Empire.

Demographics 

The United States has the highest number of Guyanese people outside of Guyana. The Guyanese-American community mostly consists of people of African and East Indian origins.

As of 1990, 80 percent of Guyanese Americans lived in the northeastern United States, especially around New York City, which is home to over 140,000 people of Guyanese descent. In Queens, 82,000 Guyanese represent the second largest foreign-born population in the borough.

Many Indo-Guyanese immigrants emigrated to New York City during the upheavals of the 1970s and 1980s and settled in South Richmond Hill. The 2000 census identified 24,662 people in Richmond Hill who were born in Guyana, the majority of whom were of Indian descent. The large concentration of Indo-Guyanese residents in  Richmond Hill and the neighboring Ozone Park, has led the area along Liberty Avenue to be referred to as 'Little Guyana.' The majority of NYC's Afro-Guyanese population lives in Brooklyn's West Indian neighborhoods, most notably Flatbush and Canarsie.

Other areas in the U.S. with significant Guyanese populations include the northern New Jersey cities of Irvington, South Plainfield, Orange and East Orange; and parts of southern and central Florida (Orlo Vista, Oakland, and Verona Walk). Smaller populations can also be found in Rockland County, New York; Schenectady, New York; Emerald Lakes, Pennsylvania; Olanta; Lincoln Park, Georgia; and Bladensburg, Maryland.

Indo-Guyanese are mostly Hindu, but some are Christians or Muslims.

Business 
The Guyanese have formed their own businesses in the United States, including many businesses along Little Guyana's Liberty Avenue that sell traditional Guyanese cuisine, jewelry, Bollywood videos and Sari clothing.

Politics 
Guyanese have organized many of the U.S. Caribbean organizations. There are many associations of nurses and police from Guyana. Although the group has not made a collective impact on U.S. national policy, they have organized, through their churches, with other ethnic groups to promote knowledge about and find solutions for the problems in their neighborhoods and have entered local politics. Despite being the 5th largest immigrant group in NYC, there are no council members of Guyanese descent.

Shirley Chisholm was the only Congresswoman of Guyanese descent in American history, as well as the first Black woman elected to the United States Congress.

Associations 
Some of the associations are the Guyana Cultural Association of New York, Indo-Caribbean Alliance, The Indo-Caribbean Federation of North America, and the Association of Guyanese-Americans. Around springtime, the Indo-Guyanese population in Richmond Hill, Queens traditionally hold a Phagwah Holi Festival & Celebration.

Relations with Guyana 
The Guyanese-American community has close ties with Guyana and sends financial aid back to family members. There are large ongoing academic exchanges between Guyana and the United States. The Journal of the Caribbean is a Caribbean newspaper important to inform the Indo-Guyanese and other Caribbean groups of their achievements and inform them about the events in Guyana. This newspaper is published weekly and distributed throughout North America. The publications of these papers are written in English. However, there are also publications in other languages. Newspapers offer services to help people. In the newspaper there is tax air tickets and visa forms, applications and service support for the elderly, advertisements for charities for children in Guyana and India.

Notable people

Actors

 Yaani King
 Dawnn Lewis
 Avi Nash
 Derek Luke
 Nicole Narain (model and actress)
 C. C. H. Pounder
 Sean Patrick Thomas

Academics
 Kerwin Kofi Charles

Historians
 Ivan van Sertima
 Fred D'Aguiar

Politicians
 Shirley Chisholm
 Cheddi Jagan
 Mel King
 John L. Sampson

Sports
 Maritza Correia – Olympic swimmer.
 Laura Creavalle – Guyanese-born Canadian/American professional bodybuilder
 Ezekiel Jackson – WWE professional wrestler and bodybuilder.
 Mark Teixeira – Major League baseball player, New York Yankees.
 Darren Collison – NBA player son of two world class Guyanese athletes.
 Warren Creavalle – Soccer player
 Calvin Ridley - NFL player for the Atlanta Falcons

Medicine 
 Deborah Persaud – Virologist

Writers 
 Gaiutra Bahadur
 Natalie Hopkinson
 Rosalind Kilkenny McLymont
 Princess Ariana Austin Makonnen

Business 
 Edual Ahmad (real estate)
 Andrew Lokenauth (finance)
 Stanley Praimnath (September 11 survivor)

Pop culture 
Rihanna (Guyanese mother)
Red Café
Godfrey Cambridge
Rafael Cameron
Kevin Darlington
Oscar Dathorne
Smoke DZA
Rhona Fox
Colle´ Kharis
Saint Jhn
Aminta Kilawan (lawyer, activist and writer. Guyanese parents) 
Mel King
Dawnn Lewis
Derek Luke (Guyanese father)
Steve Massiah
Thara Prashad
Joy-Ann Reid (Guyanese mother)
Alana Shipp
Terry Gajraj
"Princess Anisa" Singh (Guyanese parents)
Leona Lewis (Guyanese father)
Wendell Holland
Giveon (Guyanese mother)
22Gz

See also

 Guyanese people
 Indians in the New York City metropolitan area
 West Indian Americans
 African Americans
 Guyana–United States relations
 Caribbean immigration to New York City

References

Further reading
 Dindayal, Vidur. Guyanese Achievers USA & Canada: A Celebration (New York: Trafford, 2011).
 McLeod, Jacqueline A. "Guyanese Americans." Gale Encyclopedia of Multicultural America, edited by Thomas Riggs, (3rd ed., vol. 2, Gale, 2014), pp. 293–303. online
 Palmer, Ransford W. In Search of a Better Life: Perspectives on Migration from the Caribbean (Praeger, 1990).
 Ramsaroop, Yuvraj. Realizing the American Dream: The Personal Triumph of a Guyanese Immigrant (2010).

External links 
 Guyanese American Association
 Guyanese American Cultural: Florida central Association

American people of Guyanese descent
Guyanese American